Hadi Bolouri (born 21 September 1986) is an Iranian footballer. He currently plays for Alvand Hamedan in the Azadegan League.

Club career
Bolouri has been with Pas Hamedan F.C. since 2009.

 Assist Goals

References

Iranian footballers
Living people
1986 births
Pas players
Association football midfielders